True is an album by guitarists Roy Montgomery and Chris Heaphy, released on 6 April 1999 through Kranky.

Track listing

Personnel 
Adapted from the True liner notes.

Musicians
 Chris Heaphy – electric guitar
 Roy Montgomery – electric guitar, organ, electronics, recording

Production and additional personnel
 Arnie Van Bussel – engineering

Release history

References

External links 
 

1999 albums
Kranky albums
Roy Montgomery albums